The 2017–18 Kerala Premier League Season was the fifth season of the Kerala Premier League. The season featured 10 teams which was divided into 2 groups with each having 5 and is played on a home-and-away format. The season kicked off on 7 April 2018.

Teams

On 4 April 2018, it was announced that the then last champion KSEB pulled from the 2017–18 season citing financial reason. Another PSU team AG'S Office also pulled out due to internal departmental issues. Kerala Blasters FC Reserves and Quartz SC were added making 2017–18 season a 10-team affair.

Stadiums and locations

Results

League table

Group A

Group B

Knockout stage

Fixtures and results
Source: Fanport

Semi-Finals

Final

1 Later shifted to 13 May 2018 due to bad weather conditions

Season statistics

Top scorers

Hat-tricks

I-League 2nd Division Qualified teams
Quartz FC
F.C. Kerala

References

Kerala Premier League seasons
4